Mirror Master is the fourth studio album by the American alternative rock band Young the Giant. It was released on October 12, 2018, through Elektra Records.

Background
If their previous album, Home of the Strange, is about the political issues in America, then Mirror Master is quite clearly about the personal—the internal. In an interview with billboard.com, Sameer Gadhia, lead vocalist and lyricist, explains this more in depth.

The name Mirror Master comes from the idea that "You look at yourself in the mirror every day and you see a different version of yourself". Gadhia goes on to explain:

In tracks such as "Superposition", "Call Me Back", and "You + I", Sameer explores relationships and the contrast between the bliss and the complexities one can find therein. Meanwhile, in "Heat of the Summer", and "Glory", Gadhia takes on the beast: himself. “That was probably one of the most self-effacing, most vulnerable lyrics that I wrote for the record,” explains Gadhia, on "Glory".

Critical reception
Giving it 3 out of 5 stars, Neil Z. Yeung of AllMusic wrote that "Although Mirror Master drifts along without making much of an impression, there's enough to sate fans and warrant a listen."

Track listing

Charts

References

2018 albums
Elektra Records albums
Young the Giant albums